Odessa Flight Strip is a former military airfield located in Odessa, Texas.   The airfield site has been redeveloped and is now part of the urban area of the city.

This was one of the many Flight Strips which were built by the USAAF during World War II for the emergency use of military aircraft.

References

 Shaw, Frederick J. (2004), Locating Air Force Base Sites History's Legacy, Air Force History and Museums Program, United States Air Force, Washington DC, 2004.

Flight Strips of the United States Army Air Forces
Airfields of the United States Army Air Forces in Texas
Buildings and structures in Ector County, Texas